Edamura is a Japanese surname. Notable people with the surname include:

 (born 1986), Japanese footballer
Rob Edamura (born 1965), Canadian field hockey player

Japanese-language surnames